Dayyan may refer to:

 Dayyán, Mirza Asadullah-i-Khuy
 Dayan (rabbinic judge)